The United States Dragon Boat Federation (USDBF) is the official national governing body for the sport of dragon boat racing in the United States and has been a Full Member  of the International Dragon Boat Federation (IDBF) since 1991. The United States was a Charter Member of the founding of the IDBF in 1990, via the American Dragon Boat Association of Iowa. The USDBF is also a member of the Pan-American Dragon Boat Federation (PADBF). It is a volunteer organization.

The USDBF sends a national team to the IDBF World Nations Championships and representative teams to the IDBF Club Crew World Championships. It also organizes US national championships.

Mission 
The mission of the USDBF is “To promote the growth and development of dragon boating in the U.S. for fitness, recreation, and team building at all levels of competition.”

Regions & governance 
The USDBF is divided into four regions: Pacific, Midwest, Southeastern, and Eastern regions. Each region is governed by its own regional body; these governing bodies are the Pacific Dragon Boat Association of the West Coast (PDBA), the American Dragon Boat Association of the Mid-West (ADBA), the Southeastern Regional Dragon Boat Association (SRDBA), and the Eastern Regional Dragon Boat Association (ERDBA).

Club Crew National Championships (CCNC) 
The USDBF holds club crew national championships in September of every other year. A team must have accrued enough points at USDBF-sanctioned races throughout the year to qualify to compete at the CCNC. The champions of the five divisions win berths to represent the US at the following year's IDBF Club Crew World Championships.

USDBF Club Crew National Championships have been held in the following locations:

National team (Team USA)
As a member of the International Dragon Boat Federation, the USDBF sends a national team ("Team USA") to the IDBF World Nations Championships, held in odd-numbered years. Team USA is organized by the High Performance Committee of the USDBF. Members are individually picked, similar to the Olympic Team USA. The United States competes in all divisions: Junior A (aka U18), Junior B (U16), U24, Premier, Senior A, Senior B (Grand Dragons), and Senior C (Great Grand Dragons). However, the US typically only competes in standard 20-person boats, and as of 2018, has only raced small 10-person boats on the international level in 2011.

The USDBF is also allowed five berths (in each division) to send representative club crews to the IDBF Club Crew World Championships, held in even-numbered years (see CCNC section above).

Selection process 
The specifics of different coaches' selection processes differ. However, all coaches use a combination of dry land testing and on-water testing. Attitude, experience, and body weight are also considered.

 Dry-land testing typically consists of an ergometer (Concept 2 indoor rowing machine with paddle adapter) test, weight-lifting, and bodyweight exercises (push-ups, pull-ups, etc.).
 On-water testing typically consists of a time trial in an outrigger canoe. Some coaches use an OC-1, while others use an OC-2.

Coaches 
Team USA has had many coaches over the years. Some of them include: Robert "Bob" McNamara, Colleen McNamara, Pete McNamara, Randy Ng, Chris Marquart, Jaimie Richmond, Ellen Law, Pat Bradley, Jeff Kuhn, Joshua Hwung, Nathan Salazar.

Robert "Bob" McNamara is the most successful dragon boat coach in the United States. The teams he has coached/co-coached have won over 100 IDBF World Nations Championships medals, including 23 gold medals. He has been coaching since 1986.

Hosted IDBF World Nations Championships 
The United States hosted the 4th IDBF World Nations Championships in Philadelphia, Pennsylvania in 2001, and the 10th IDBF World Nations Championships in Tampa Bay, Florida in 2011.

United States at IDBF World Nations Championships (WDBRC) 
The United States has won many medals at the international level; medals standings from the IDBF World Nations Championships (also called the World Dragon Boat Racing Championships, or WDBRC) are listed below.

13th WDBRC 2017 (Kunming, China) 
Team USA came in 3rd overall in standard boat racing, with Canada taking 1st and China taking 2nd.

The Junior/U24 division races were held in Divonne-les-Bains, in conjunction with the European Club Crew Championships. Team USA did not attend.

12th WDBRC 2015 (Welland, Canada) 
Team USA came in 3rd overall in standard boat racing, with Canada taking 1st and China taking 2nd.

11th WDBRC 2013 (Szeged, Hungary) 
Team USA came in 6th overall, behind Canada, China, Australia, Germany, and Ukraine.

10th WDBRC 2011 (Tampa, USA) 
Team USA came in 1st overall in small boat racing.

Team USA came in 4th overall in standard boat racing, behind Canada, Germany, and Russia.

9th WDBRC 2009 (Račice, Czech Republic) 
Team USA came in 5th overall, behind Canada, Slovakia, China, and Singapore.

United States at IDBF Club Crew World Championships (CCWC) 
Many different crews have represented the United States at the IDBF CCWCs over the years. Listed below are some of those teams, along with the divisions in which they raced.

11th CCWC 2018 (Szeged, Hungary)

10th CCWC 2016 (Adelaide, Australia)

9th CCWC 2014 (Ravenna, Italy)

See also 

 Dragon boat
 International Dragon Boat Federation
 Breast cancer survivors' dragon boating
 United States of America
 American sports

External links 

 Official website

References 

Dragon Boat
Dragon boat racing